Paulette Christian (née, Paulette Sandan; Nice, France, 1927 - Buenos Aires, Argentina, November 20, 1967) was a French-Argentine vedette, singer and actress of film, theater and television who had a long career in Argentina. 
Christian had been a member of the anti-Nazi resistance during World War II. She spent seven years in the US. She made her acting career during Argentina's golden age of film and television. She appeared with José Cibrian, Osvaldo Miranda, Angel Magaña, Zulma Faiad, Jorge Larrea, Susana Campos, Amelia Bence, among others. She debuted on television in 1955. She was a pioneer in the French bataclanas style in Argentina, along with May Avril and Xénia Monty. She committed suicide in 1967.

Filmography 

 Cuidado con las colas (1964)
 El campeón soy yo (1960) (produced in 1955)
 Amor se dice cantando (1957)
 Mi marido y mi novio (1955)

Television
 1955:  Tres valses
 1956: Comedias musicales
 1956: La abuela, la juventud y el amor
 1956: Noches elegantes
 1957: Bohemia 
 1958: Él, ella y los otros
 1959: La azafata enamorada
 1959: Amores cruzados
 1960: Tropicana Club
 1963: Un señor Locatti
 1965: El Especial

Theater
 Polydora
 Un ruiseñor cantaba
 El signo de Kikota (1963)
 Boeing-Boeing (1964)
 Delicado equilibrio (1967)

References

Bibliography

External links

Paulette Christian at Cinenacional

1927 births
1967 deaths
People from Nice
French film actresses
French stage actresses
French television actresses
Argentine film actresses
Argentine stage actresses
Argentine telenovela actresses
Argentine vedettes
1967 suicides
20th-century French women
Drug-related suicides in Argentina
Barbiturates-related deaths